Tentax tentaxia is a moth of the family Erebidae first described by Michael Fibiger in 2011. It is found on Borneo (it was described from Sarawak, near Kuching).

The wingspan is about 11 mm. The head, labial palps, patagia, thorax, tegulae and forewings (including fringes) are reddish brown. There are beige costal patches on each side of medial area of the forewings. The basal costal patch and upper quadrangular medial area are brown, the latter with a black inner dot. The abdomen is reddish brown. The crosslines are reddish brown, except for the brown terminal line. The hindwings are grey. The underside of the forewings is brown and the underside of the hindwings is grey with a discal spot.

References

Micronoctuini
Taxa named by Michael Fibiger
Moths described in 2011